Victoria Records was started in 1951 by Al Alberts of The Four Aces in Philadelphia, Pennsylvania to release their recording of "(It's No) Sin." This record charted nationally at No. 4 in September 1951.

References

See also
 List of record labels
 Victoria Records

American record labels
Record labels established in 1952
Vanity record labels
Soul music record labels